Herschel Supply Co. is a Canadian company selling hipster retro backpacks and accessories.

The company was founded by Lyndon and Jamie Cormack in 2009 and is based in Vancouver, British Columbia, Canada.   

Herschel manufactures its products in 15 factories in China. They comprise backpacks, duffel bags, other luggage, hats and other accessories. The brand is aimed at 18-to-35-year-old consumers, and is based on evoking a sense of American nostalgia – for instance through synthetic leather straps and an old-time logo, as well as through its name, which refers to Herschel, Saskatchewan, a very small Canadian hamlet where the founders great grandparents settled.

Herschel's first store in Canada opened in Vancouver's Gastown in 2018. Herschel operates 44 retail locations worldwide, from Hong Kong to Dubai to Paris. Slate described the brand as "a global phenomenon, glimpsed wherever hipsters dare to tread."

Creativity Awards 
In 2022, Herschel created the Herschel Supply Bank of Creativity awards. In 2022, the awardees included 9 creatives in the fields of film, fashion, photography, music, and more.

Film and Content 
Kirsten Pardo, Executive Director of OneStudio Media

Chassidy David, member of Scope Of Work (SOW)

Alexandra Shuford, content creator

Music 
LeAnne Chan, indie rock musician

Photography 
Kalena P. Burwell, a member of Herschel's Artist in Residence program in New York City.

Amos Reece III

Fashion 
Zino Haro, CEO and co-founder of fashion tech company Uni-ke

Visual Arts 
Liah Paterson, ceramicist

Ashley Pusey, chemical engineer, photographer, and candle maker

External links

Official Instagram

References

Luggage brands
Luggage manufacturers
Manufacturing companies based in Vancouver
2009 establishments in British Columbia